Belmont is an 'L' station on the CTA's Blue Line. The station is located at Belmont and Kimball Avenues in the Avondale neighborhood. From Belmont, trains run at intervals of 2–7 minutes during rush hours, and take 16 minutes to reach the Loop.

History

Belmont station opened in 1970 as part of an extension of the West-Northwest route to Jefferson Park on the Kennedy Expressway. The station is similar in design as the previous station, Logan Square, as an underground, island platform station. Unlike Logan Square, Belmont has only one exit.

Belmont Blue Gateway Project 
The $17 million project began in 2017 and was completed on March 29, 2019, with additional work continuing on the station's platform until August 30, 2019.

Bus connections
CTA
 77 Belmont (Owl Service)
 82 Kimball-Homan

References

External links
Belmont (O'Hare Line) Station Page
Belmont Avenue entrance from Google Maps Street View

CTA Blue Line stations
Railway stations in the United States opened in 1970